Group Captain  Lubbock Robinson  (1886  – 5 November 1949) was an Irish field hockey player who competed in the 1908 Summer Olympics and a decorated officer of the British Army and Royal Air Force.

Robinson was educated at Edinburgh House School and St Columba's College in Dublin. In 1908, he represented the United Kingdom of Great Britain and Ireland as a member of the Irish national team, which won the silver medal.

Robinson enlisted in the British Army in 1914. In September 1915, he received the Military Cross while serving with the Royal Marine Artillery in Ypres, "for conspicuous gallantry and devotion to duty as Artillery Observing Officer." He later enlisted in the Royal Air Force, earning the Distinguished Flying Cross in 1921.

In 1933, he was appointed an aide-de-camp to King George VI. He retired in 1939.

References

External links
 

1886 births
1949 deaths
Members of the Ireland hockey team at the 1908 Summer Olympics
Irish male field hockey players
Companions of the Distinguished Service Order
Recipients of the Military Cross
Recipients of the Distinguished Flying Cross (United Kingdom)
British Army personnel of World War I
Royal Air Force officers
Medalists at the 1908 Summer Olympics
Olympic silver medallists for Great Britain
People educated at St Columba's College, Dublin
Irish officers in the British Army
Ireland international men's field hockey players